José de Calasanz or in Catalan Calassanç , (al secolo José Vives y Tutó (or, in Catalan, Josep Vives i Tutó); his given name is written in English as Joseph Calasanz), O.F.M. Cap. (15 February 1854 – 7 September 1913), was an influential Spanish Roman Catholic theologian, member of the Capuchin friars and from 19 June 1899 also cardinal.  To distinguish him from the saint Giuseppe Calasanzio from whom he took his name, he is known as either José de Calasanz Vives y Tutó or Cardinal Calasanz.

Initally studying as a boy with the priest of the Scuole Pie, he then directly entered the Capuchin order. In 1869-1870, he was in the novitiate while in Guatemala, but social disorder and anticlericalism led to him to flee to France. He was sent back to the Americas by the order, but by 1880 he was in a monastery of Igeselda in Spain. He was sent by the order to Rome to discuss the disunion among Capuchin branches, this led in 1899, to having Pope Leo XIII name him cardinal. 

He was involved in the elaboration of church doctrines and canon law; as an ally of the conservative and reactionary Cardinals Rafael Merry del Val and Gaetano de Lai, he remain influential with Pope Pius X. 
 
In 1908, he became the first Prefect of what is now known as the Congregation for Institutes of Consecrated Life and Societies of Apostolic Life, and held the position until his death. He was well known for his traditionalist position. He was the personal confessor of Pope Pius X.

References

External links 
 

20th-century Spanish cardinals
Cardinals created by Pope Leo XIII
1854 births
1913 deaths
Members of the Congregation for Institutes of Consecrated Life and Societies of Apostolic Life
Capuchins